The Nizam-ı Cedid Army refers to the new military establishment of the Nizam-ı Cedid reform program. The Nizam-i Cedid army was largely a failure in its own time, but proved to be a much more effective infantry force than the Janissaries.

After losing the Russo-Turkish War of 1787–92 in 1792 to Austria and Russia, Selim III concluded that Ottoman military was in serious need of reform if the empire was to survive. As a result, he began implementing a series of reforms aimed at reorganizing the military after the fashion of European militaries. This included the usage of European training tactics, weapons, and even officers. These reforms troubled the Janissaries, who were suspicious and unreceptive towards the reforms. To this end, Selim III created the Nizam-i Djedid in 1797 in order to develop a replacement for the Janissaries. By 1806 this new army stood 26,000 men strong, equipped with a French-style uniforms, European weapons, and a modern artillery corps. Due to their distinctly modern nature, the army was named Nizam-ı Cedid, which has the meaning of 'New Order,' in Ottoman Turkish. 

However, when war with the Russian Empire broke out once again, Sultan Selim III hesitated to use Western drilled army in combat, despite its strong numbers of over 25,000. The old order strongly opposed this age of reform in the Ottoman Empire. First evidenced in the 1806 Edirne incident when Selim III's efforts to expand the New Order into Thrace were forcibly halted by a coalition of Janissaries and local ayans, and, later, by his deposition in May 1807 during which the soldiers of the New Order were either disbanded or massacred. While the Nizam-i Djedid was ultimately a failure for Selim III, the effort would be continued under the reign of Mahmud II following the destruction of the Janissary Corps during the Auspicious Incident. Military defeats against Russia would not cease however.

Recruitment and training

Organisation and Strength

Battles
In 1799, a contingent Nizam-I Cedid was involved in combat assisting Jezzar Pasha in his resistance against Napoleon in Gaza Strip.A group of Nizam-I Cedid infantry and artillerymen on the side of Admiral Sir Sydney Smith successfully defended Acre. One third of the Ottoman forces were sent to aid British forces removing the French from Egypt while the Nizams also played the vital leading role in capturing of Rashid.
In September 1806. Ibrahim-pasha Bushatli  governor of Scutari led army of Nizams on Deligrad fortress during battle of Deligrad during First Serbian uprising.

Popular culture
The Nizam-I Cedid appears in total war video game series: Empire: Total War and Napoleon: Total War, serving as a new regular line-infantry.
The Nizam Fusilier appears in the Definitive Edition of Age of Empires 3, as a unique Ottoman infantry unit.

Bibliography 
Armies of the Ottoman Empire 1775–1820

See also
Ottoman Reforms
Sekban-i Djedid Army

References

Military history of the Ottoman Empire
Military units and formations of the Ottoman Empire
Reform in the Ottoman Empire